Forchia is a comune (municipality) in the Province of Benevento in the Italian region Campania, located about 35 km northeast of Naples and about 25 km southwest of Benevento.

The name Forchia is the translation of Latin forculae, meaning "oxbow".

It borders the following municipalities: Airola, Arienzo, Arpaia, Moiano, Roccarainola.

References

Cities and towns in Campania